Josef Bochníček (January 15, 1896 – July 8, 1969) was a Czech gymnast who competed for Czechoslovakia in the 1920 Summer Olympics. He was born and died in Prague. In 1920 he was a member of the Czechoslovak gymnastic team which finished fourth in the team event.

References

1896 births
1969 deaths
Czech male artistic gymnasts
Czechoslovak male artistic gymnasts
Olympic gymnasts of Czechoslovakia
Gymnasts at the 1920 Summer Olympics
Gymnasts from Prague